Groveton is a city in Trinity County, Texas, United States. The population was 918 at the 2020 census. It is the county seat of Trinity County.

Geography
According to the United States Census Bureau, the city has a total area of 2.6 sq mi (6.8 km), of which, 2.6 sq mi (6.6 km) are land and 0.1 sq mi (0.1 km)  (1.91%) is covered by water.

Demographics

As of the 2020 United States census, there were 918 people, 496 households, and 307 families residing in the city.

As of the census of 2000,  1,107 people, 444 households, and 278 families resided in the city. The population density was 431.6 people/sq mi (167.0/km). The 565 housing units averaged 220.3/sq mi (85.2/km). The racial makeup of the city was 73.08% White, 18.25% African American, 0.18% Native American, 0.09% Asian, 6.23% from other races, and 2.17% from two or more races. Hispanics or Latinos of any race were 11.38% of the population.

Of the 444 households, 32.0% had children under the age of 18 living with them, 41.2% were married couples living together, 16.2% had a female householder with no husband present, and 37.2% were no tfamilies. About 34.9% of all households were made up of individuals, and 21.6% had someone living alone who was 65 years of age or older. The average household size was 2.34 and the average family size was 3.04.

In the city, the population was distributed as 25.8% under the age of 18, 8.2% from 18 to 24, 24.8% from 25 to 44, 18.3% from 45 to 64, and 22.9% who were 65 years of age or older. The median age was 38 years. For every 100 females, there were 84.2 males. For every 100 females age 18 and over, there were 76.9 males.

The median income for a household in the city was $32,688. Males had a median income of $25,938 versus $22,532 for females. The per capita income for the city was $11,890. About 22.0% of families and 26.6% of the population were below the poverty line, including 31.7% of those under age 18 and 25.9% of those age 65 or over.

According to an estimate from 2015–2019 American Community Survey 5-Year Estimate estimate of 70.3% of residents are high school graduate or higher

Education
The City of Groveton is served by the Groveton Independent School District and is home to the Groveton Indians.

Media
The Groveton News is published weekly by Polk County Publishing Company.

Notable people
 Cody Johnson, country music singer-songwriter
 Lane Johnson, American football player
 Topper Rigney, baseball player
 Rodney Thomas, American football player
 Jacky Ward, country music singer

References

External links

 

Cities in Texas
Cities in Trinity County, Texas
County seats in Texas